Ozzfest 2001: The Second Millennium is a compilation of live recordings from Ozzfest 2001.

Track listing

References

2001 live albums
2001 compilation albums
Ozzfest